Elections for the House of Representatives of the Philippines were held on May 11, 1998. Held on the same day as the presidential election, the party of the incumbent president, Fidel V. Ramos' Lakas-NUCD-UMDP, won majority of the seats in the House of Representatives. For the first time since the People Power Revolution, a party won majority of the seats in the House; Lakas had a seat over the majority. This is also the first Philippine elections that included the party-list system.

However, with Joseph Estrada of the opposition Laban ng Makabayang Masang Pilipino (LAMMP; an electoral alliance between the Partido ng Masang Pilipino (PMP), the NPC and the Laban ng Demokratikong Pilipino (LDP)) winning the presidential election, the majority of the elected Lakas-NUCD-UMDP congressmen switched sides to LAMMP. This led to Manuel Villar, Jr. (formerly of Lakas but became a LAMMP member prior to the election) on being elected as the Speaker of the House.

The elected representatives served in the 11th Congress from 1998 to 2001.

Results

District elections

Party-list election
There were 52 seats for sectoral representatives that were contested. Each party has to get 2% of the national vote to win one seat; they would win an additional seat for every 2% of the vote, up to the maximum three seats. Only 14 party-list representatives were elected under this rule, leaving 38 unfilled seats. Eventually, the "2–4–6%" rule was ruled as unconstitutional by the Supreme Court on October 6, 2000 on the case Veterans Federation Party, et. al. vs. COMELEC. Despite this ruling, no additional seats were awarded to any party-lists.

See also
11th Congress of the Philippines

References

  

1998
1998 elections in the Philippines